The Victory Tour may refer to:

Performances:
 Victory Tour (The Jacksons tour)
 Victory Tour (Jedward tour)
 Victory Tour (Modern Talking tour)

Fiction:
 Victory Tour, in The Hunger Games